The Snowball family was a prominent settler Creole family of Nova Scotian descent. The Snowballs were originally African-American slaves from "Princess Ann County, Virginia" and were formerly the property of Richard Murray. Nathaniel Snowball, who was the son of Violet Snowball and the brother of Mary Snowball, was only 12 years old when he was recorded in the Book of Negroes and described as a "fine boy. Formerly the property of Richard Murray of Princess Ann County, Virginia; left him 7 years ago". Nathaniel became a prominent settler and the patriarch of the Snowball family in Settler Town, Sierra Leone.

Sources 
 
 
 
 

Sierra Leone Creole families
Sierra Leone Creole people
People of Sierra Leone Creole descent
African-American families